Giridhar is an Indian given name and surname which means, "one who holds a mountain." Krishna was known by this name as a title after holding up Govardhan hill. Notable people with the name include:

 Giridhar Gamang (born 1943), Indian politician
 Giridhar Madras, Indian academic
 Giridhar Udupa ,Indian musician
 Subhashni Giridhar, Indian dancer

Hindu given names
Indian masculine given names
Indian surnames